WNIS (790 AM) is a commercial radio station in Norfolk, Virginia, and serving the Hampton Roads radio market.  WNIS is owned and operated by Sinclair Telecable, Inc.  It airs a talk radio format.

WNIS has studios and offices on Waterside Drive in Norfolk.  Its transmitter is off Hall Road in Hampton.  It transmits with 5,000 watts around the clock, using a directional antenna with a three-tower array.

Weekdays, WNIS has local morning drive time talk and information shows called "Marcrini's Morning News"  and the “Karen and Mike Show.” Other weekday hours feature nationally syndicated shows from Sean Hannity, Brian Kilmeade, "Clay Travis & Buck Sexton," Mark Levin, "Coast to Coast AM with George Noory" and "This Morning, America's First News with Gordon Deal."  Weekends feature shows on money, health, cars and fishing, with syndicated hosts including Kim Komando, Guy Benson, Rudy Maxa, Mike Imprevento, "Live on Sunday Night, It's Bill Cunningham" and "Somewhere in Time with Art Bell."   Most hours begin with world and national news from Fox News Radio.

History
The station signed on in September 1952 as WRAP,  a daytimer at 1050 kHz, with a power of 500 watts.  It was required to sign-off at sunset to avoid interfering with other radio stations on AM 1050, primarily XEG in Monterrey, Mexico.

In 1956, another Norfolk daytimer, 860 WCAV, left the air, allowing WRAP to relocate to AM 850.  On the new frequency, WRAP could broadcast around the clock.  The daytime power was increased to 5,000 watts and the nighttime power to 1,000 watts.

WRAP was programmed to Norfolk's African-American community.  Its call sign used the word "RAP," an African-American English word for "talk" or "discussion."  (It would be several decades before "rap" began referring to a musical style.)  An advertisement in the 1957 edition of Broadcasting Yearbook, using the descriptions of the era, said "Survey figures show the most Negroes in the Norfolk area listen most to WRAP." It added that WRAP, at 850 kilocycles, was "the only all-Negro station in Norfolk."  For more on the history of the station, see WRAP (Norfolk).

In 1987, WRAP was acquired by local cable TV company Clinton Cablevision (later Sinclair Telecable).  The new owner flipped the format to talk.  The call sign was changed to WNIS, standing for "News and Information Station".  The R&B format and WRAP call letters moved to AM 1350 in nearby Portsmouth (now gospel-formatted WGPL).  WNIS picked up programming from ABC Talkradio, NBC Talknet and the Mutual Broadcasting System's Larry King Show.

The host who launched the new format was Gordon Hammett, a New York City radio veteran who had more than 40 years in the industry with stints that included WNBC, WMCA, and WNEW. He started a club called the Tidewater Talkers for his loyal listeners.  His guests ranged from Sen. John Warner to Al Goldstein.

In July 1997, WNIS and its sister station, WTAR, switched facilities.  WNIS moved to AM 790, while WTAR took over the 850 kHz spot on the dial.  850 has the stronger signal, broadcasting at 50,000 watts by day, the highest power authorized for AM stations by the Federal Communications Commission.  At night it runs 25,000 watts, while 790 kHz transmits 5,000 watts day and night.  Both stations had talk formats, although 850 WTAR is now a sports radio station and network affiliate of Fox Sports Radio.

References

External links
 AM 790 WNIS Online
 Sinclair Telecable List of Stations

NIS
News and talk radio stations in the United States
Radio stations established in 1923
1923 establishments in Virginia